Elmer B. Boyd Memorial Park is a 20-acre municipal park running along the Raritan River in New Brunswick, New Jersey. Named after a news publisher, the park was rehabilitated and reopened in 1999 at a cost of $11 million.

The park is the location for the New Brunswick Landing, a floating dock with 24 slips available for boaters. It is part of the Middlesex County Park System.

Gallery

References 

New Brunswick, New Jersey
Municipal parks in the United States
Parks in Middlesex County, New Jersey
Raritan River